Someone Here Is Missing is the eighth studio album by The Pineapple Thief, featuring cover art by Storm Thorgerson.

Track listing
All songs written by Bruce Soord.

Personnel
Bruce Soord: vocals, acoustic & electric guitars, keyboards, programming
Steve Kitch: keyboards, synthesizers
Jon Sykes: acoustic & electric bass, vocals
Keith Harrison: drums, percussion, vocals

Production
Arranged by The Pineapple Thief
Produced & engineered by Bruce Soord
Mixed by Mark Bowyer & Steve Kitch
Mastered by Dave Turner
Artwork by designer Storm Thorgerson

References

External links
The Pineapple Thief's official website
Someone Here Is Missing microsite

2010 albums
The Pineapple Thief albums
Kscope albums
Albums with cover art by Storm Thorgerson